The Scobie Breasley Medal is an annual Jockeys award, first presented by Racing Victoria Limited in 1996, that recognises excellence in race riding on Melbourne racetracks. Votes are cast by racing stewards at each  meeting and are awarded on a 3-2-1 basis to what they deem to be the best ride of the day.

It is named in honour of the jockey Scobie Breasley, the first person inducted into the Australian Racing Hall of Fame.

Winners
 2020 Damien Oliver
 2019 Damien Oliver
 2018 Damien Oliver
 2017 Craig Williams
 2016 Dwayne Dunn
 2015 Damien Oliver
 2014 Damien Oliver
 2013 Michael Rodd
 2012 Luke Nolen
 2011 Luke Nolen
 2010 Glen Boss
 2009 Craig Williams
 2008 Craig Williams
 2007 Craig Williams
 2006 Craig Williams
 2005 Blake Shinn
 2004 Damien Oliver
 2003 Damien Oliver/Kerrin McEvoy (dead heat)
 2002 Damien Oliver
 2001 Damien Oliver/Brett Prebble (dead heat)
 2000 Brett Prebble
 1999 Damien Oliver
 1998 Greg Childs
 1997 Steven King
 1996 Damien Oliver

References

Australian Thoroughbred racing awards